Milan Marić (born 26 September 1981) is a Serbian actor, best known for his role in The Wounds.

Biography
Milan Marić was born in 1981 in Belgrade.

In 1998 he had his cinematic debut in the film The Wounds, in the lead role of Shvaba.

His next work was in 2004, in the drama film Breathe Deeply, where he played a supporting part. It was about the main heroine Sasha whose ambitions are thwarted by a car crash. A year later, the actor appeared in the comedy We are not Angels-2, where he again starred in an episodic role, of a businessman. In the comedy film, a character named Nicola (Nicola Coyo), the father of a 15-year-old daughter, a ladies' man, who undertakes to protect his daughter from importunate admirers, was told about the comedy.

Soon Milan appeared in a television project, crime drama Storks will Return about three adventurers who are forced to settle in a village to hide from persecution. Later there was a continuation of the film entitled Storks in the Fog, where Milan Marić also played.

In 2009, the drama Forbidden Love with Milan was released on Serbian cinema screens, followed two years later by the premiere of the comedy The Parade, which was about the formation of the LGBT movement in Serbia.

In 2010 he appeared in the reality show Veliki brat, a Serbian version of the Big Brother.

The 2013 film Mamaroš was particularly significant in the actor's career. The film about the life of "mama's boy" Pera Ilić (Bogdan Diklich), a Belgorod cinema projectionist, was shown at the Moscow International Film Festival.

Selected filmography

Film
The Wounds (1998)
The Parade (2011)
Mamaroš (2013)

TV
Veliki brat (2010)

References

External links

1981 births
Living people
Physicians from Belgrade
Serbian male film actors
Serbian male television actors
Serbian male stage actors
Serbian male actors
20th-century Serbian male actors
21st-century Serbian male actors